The following is a list of all the cars that have raced in the two Bathurst 24 Hour motor race in 2002 and 2003. This is a list of cars as they were sold and marketed to the general public, not the homologation racing editions.

Alfa Romeo

Alfa Romeo 156 - 2003

BMW

BMW 318i - 2002 
BMW 320i - 2002, 2003 
BMW 323i - 2002 
BMW M Coupe - 2002, 2003
BMW M3 - 2002, 2003

Ferrari

Ferrari 360 - 2002, 2003

Ford

Ford Falcon - 2002, 2003

Holden

Holden Commodore - 2002, 2003
Holden Monaro - 2002, 2003

Honda

Honda Integra - 2003
Honda S2000 - 2002, 2003

Lamborghini

Lamborghini Diablo - 2003

Mazda

Mazda RX-7 - 2002

Mitsubishi

Mitsubishi Lancer Evolution - 2002, 2003
Mitsubishi Magna - 2002
Mitsubishi Mirage - 2002, 2003

Morgan

Morgan Aero 8 - 2003

Mosler

Mosler MT900 - 2002, 2003

Nissan

Nissan 200SX - 2002, 2003
Nissan 350Z - 2002, 2003

Porsche

Porsche 996 - 2002, 2003

Subaru

Subaru Impreza WRX - 2002, 2003

Toyota

Toyota Altezza - 2003
Toyota Celica - 2003
Toyota MR2 - 2002

References

Motorsport in Bathurst, New South Wales